West Brook (population approx. 100) is a community in Cumberland County, Nova Scotia. Its main industries are agricultural: forestry and the harvesting of wild blueberries.

Communities in Cumberland County, Nova Scotia
General Service Areas in Nova Scotia